Boukman Eksperyans is a mizik rasin band from the city of Port-au-Prince, Haiti, Grammy nominated for their debut album Vodou Adjae. The band derives its name from Dutty Boukman, a vodou priest who led a religious ceremony in 1791 that is widely considered the start of the Haitian Revolution. The other half of the band's name, "Eksperyans", is the Haitian Creole word for "experience", and was inspired by the band's appreciation of the music of Jimi Hendrix.  The band was at the height of its popularity in 1991 when the presidency of Jean Bertrand Aristide was overthrown in a military coup d'etat. Like many other artists and performers, Boukman Eksperyans fled the country to live in exile. During their time abroad, the band performed and spoke out against the military dictatorship of Raoul Cédras. In 1994, after Aristide was restored to power, the band returned to Haiti, where they continued to play concerts, record albums, and perform at the Carnival celebrations.

History

Boukman Eksperyans was founded in 1978 by Theodore Beaubrun Jr., nicknamed Lolo, Marjorie Beaubrun (Lolo's sister), Daniel Beaubrun, Mimerose Beaubrun (Lolo's wife), and members of various other groups who launched the mizik rasin revolution in Haiti in the late 1970s. One of these groups was led by Fanfan Alexis, and included the future musicians of such groups as Group Sa, Foula, and Rara Machine. Lolo's father, Theodore Beaubrun (also known by his stage name Languichatte Debordus) was a comedian and was often referred to as the Bill Cosby of Haiti. While on tour in the United States, he brought back a James Brown LP which left a lasting impression on young Lolo. After his parents divorced, he followed his mother to Brooklyn, New York. In the United States, he studied two years of business administration. 

Lolo returned to Haiti in 1978, where some bands were playing music known as minidjaz. To Lolo, they seemed to pay no attention to song lyrics that dealt with reality. They were even accused of aligning too closely to the Duvaliers. When Lolo and Mimerose began to seek their musical goals, they felt a strong desire to incorporate the African element in Haiti's culture into their music. They decided to combine roots music with vodou religious and musical traditions. 

Lolo's grandfather was deeply involved in vodou, but his parents never made this available to him. Lolo and Mimrose entered their first vodou lakou-s, a Haitian spiritual community, where they met musicians and singers. They also got their first real glance at the African culture of Haiti in the form it was handed down from members of various tribes. They founded a group to study vodou music, giving it the name of Moun Ife ("People of the Abode of the Deities"). Lolo stated that Bob Marley, another important musical inspiration, made him think. When he heard the Jamaican legend in 1976, he thought he could create something similar in Haiti with vodou. Lolo and Mimerose began to perform as a live act in the 1980s.

The traditional roots instruments were replaced by electric instruments, like the bass guitar and two guitars played by members Eddy François and Daniel Beaubrun, Lolo's brother and the band's chief arranger. In 1985, the group changed their name to "Boukman Eksperyans", the name of Fanfan Alexis's former band, of which Lolo was the lead singer. The name was a tribute to the Jamaican born slave leader Boukman Dutty, who launched the Haitian slave rebellion in August 1791. "Eksperyans" was in honor of the "high priest of rock music", Jimi Hendrix. Since the beginning, starting with the first encounters made by the Beaubruns with deep African roots, Boukman Eksperyans has remained steadfastly linked to the Ginen ("Guinea") vodou line. The band calls it vodou adjae after a vodou ceremonial dance. This was also the title of their first album, released in 1991.

Boukman Eksperyans first became famous in 1990 when they presented their song "Ke'm Pa Sote" at the Carnival celebration in Port-au-Prince. The song included the refrain "My heart doesn't leap, I'm not afraid". This song was a protest against the living conditions under the post-Duvalier interim military government of General Prosper Avril. After a young girl was shot dead by a soldier, this song became an out-and-out battle hymn admonishing the government. The band continued to write and perform rebellious songs. The band members were never directly threatened, but were advised 'never go out at night'. When the military junta overthrew president Jean-Bertrand Aristide in 1991, the band decided to leave the country for their own safety.

Just before the second coup d'état against Aristide in 2004, Lolo joined with many others in protesting the abuses at the very least condoned by the President. In the years following, Boukman Eksperyans was not associated with any political party. Their songs depicted the reality of Haiti as they saw it.

Mimerose Beaubrun's book Nan Domi: An Initiate's Journey into Haitian Voudou, was published in 2013 by City Lights Publishers .

Discography

Sources:

References

External links

MySpace page
Boukman Eksperyans auf culturebase.net

Haitian musical groups
Haitian Vodou